Kjetil Bjørlo (born 27 March 1968) is a Norwegian orienteering competitor, individual bronze medalist in the classic course at the 1997 World Orienteering Championships in Grimstad.

He received a bronze medal in the relay event in 1997, together with Håvard Tveite, Bjørnar Valstad and Petter Thoresen.

References

External links
 
 

1968 births
Living people
People from Halden
Norwegian orienteers
Male orienteers
Foot orienteers
World Orienteering Championships medalists
Sportspeople from Viken (county)
20th-century Norwegian people